Sisillius (Welsh: Saessyllt) was the name of three legendary Kings of the Britons as accounted by Geoffrey of Monmouth:

Sisillius, one of the younger sons of Ebraucus
Sisillius I, successor of King Gurgustius
Sisillius II, son of King Guithelin and Queen Marcia
Sisillius III, successor of King Oenus

British traditional history